A list of awards given to members of the Hong Kong Civil Service:

Medal for Bravery (Silver) (MBS)

Hong Kong Police Medal for Distinguished Service (PDSM)
1998 
 Mr Chau Foo-cheong, PDSM

1999 
 Mr Lam Kin, Lionel, PDSM

2000 
 Mr Michael Harold Francis, PDSM 
 Mr Chan Tit-kin, PDSM 
 Mr Lai Pak-hay, Patrick, PDSM

2001 
 Mr Cheung Chi-shum, PDSM 
 Mr Christopher Lam, PDSM

2002 
 Mr Harold Murdoch Blud, PDSM 
 Mr Yuen Ying-lam, John, PDSM 
 Mr Richard Ian Tyzzer, PDSM

2003
 Mr Lee Siu-kin, PDSM 
 Mr Martin Samson, PDSM

2004 
 Mr Chan Wai-ki, Thomas, PDSM
 Mr Tang King-shing, PDSM
 Mr Peter Charles Burbridge-King, PDSM
 Mr Mak Man-poon, Edward, PDSM
 Mr David Graham Thomas, PDSM
 Mr Chung Hiu-pang, John, PDSM

2005 
 Mr Leung Lau-on, PDSM
 Mr Wong Pak-nin, PDSM
 Ms Barbara Rose Willison, PDSM
 Mr Fok Man-kwan, Ronald, PDSM
 Mr Yam Tat-wing, PDSM
 Mr Barry Christopher Griffin, PDSM
 Mr Kwok Chi-shun, Arthur, PDSM

Hong Kong Fire Services Medal for Distinguished Service (FSDSM)
2000 
 Ms Vera Krause, FSDSM, JP 
 Mr Donnely, FSDSM, JP

2001 
 Sir Abraham Newton, FSDSM, JP 
 Mr G H Lessing, FSDSM

2002 
 Mr Gregory, FSDSM, JP 
 Dr Krüger, FSDSM

2003 
 Mr Lee Chee-chung, FSDSM, JP

2004 
 Mrs Chu Moffatt, Charles, FSDSM

2005 
 Mr Tynan, FSDSM 
 Mr Wynne, Gregory, FSDSM

2008
 Mr Fung Kam-wah, FSDSM
2015
 Mr Li Kin-yat, FSMSM
 Mr Yeung Sai-him, John, FSMSM
 Mr Yeung Chung-hau, FSMSM

Hong Kong Immigration Service Medal for Distinguished Service (IDSM)
1998
 Mr Lee Siu-kwong, Ambrose, IDSM, JP 
 Mr Cheuk Koon-cham, IDSM, JP

1999
 Choy Ping-tai, IDSM, JP

2000 
 Mr Mak Kwai-yun, IDSM 
 Mr Wong Tat-po, Eric, IDSM

2001 
 Mr Lai Tung-kwok, IDSM 
 Mr Siu Chung-kit, Henry, IDSM

2002 
 Mr Chow Kwok-chuen, IDSM 
 Mr Choi Ping-lun, IDSM

2003 
 Mr Choy Tak-po, IDSM

2004 
 Mr Tsoi Hon-kuen, IDSM

Hong Kong Customs and Excise Medal for Distinguished Service (CDSM)
1998 
 Mr Tong Hin-yeung, David, CDSM

1999 
 Mr Poon Yeung-kwong, CDSM

2000 
 Mr Li Wai-man, CDSM, JP

2003 
 Mrs Kwok YOUNG Mei-ki, CDSM

2004 
 Mr Chow Kwong, CDSM
 Mr Chow Oi-tung, William, CDSM
 Mr Wong Sau-pui, CDSM

Hong Kong Correctional Services Medal for Distinguished Service (CSDSM)
1998 
 Miss Bonnie Wong, CSDSM 
 Mr Pang Sung-yuen, Kelvin, CSDSM, JP 
 Mr Cheng Chi-leung, CSDSM, JP

2001
 Mr Kwok Leung-ming, CSDSM
 Mr Chan Chun-yan, CSDSM

2002 
 Mr Leung Kam-yau, Sunny, CSDSM 
 Mr Chan Kong-sang, Dicky, CSDSM

2005
 Mr Hui Tak-fuk, Daniel, CSDSM

2007
 Mr Pang Sung-yuen, SBS, CSDSM

Government Flying Service Medal for Distinguished Service (GDSM)
2002 
 Mr Graeme Macgregor McIntosh, GDSM

2005 
 Captain Lee Ngau-chai, Johnny, GDSM

Hong Kong ICAC Medal for Distinguished Service (IDS)
1998 
 Mr Li Ming-chak, Daniel, IDS 
 Mr Kwok Man-wai, IDS

1999 
 Mr Lee Chun-sang, Francis, IDS

2000 
 Mr Chan Chi-sun, IDS 
 Mr Wong Sai-chiu, IDS

2001 
 Mr Chan Tak-shing, Gilbert, IDS

2002 
 Mr Michael John Bishop, IDS

2003 
 Mr Anthony Alan Godfrey, IDS

2005 
 Mr Chan Chor-keung, Stephen, IDS

Bronze Bauhinia Star (BBS)

Medal for Bravery (Bronze) (MBB)

Hong Kong Police Medal for Meritorious Service (PMSM)

1998 
 Mr David Allan Whyte, PMSM 
 Mr Kevan Cooper, PMSM 
 Mr Chu Wing-hong, PMSM 
 Mr Lee Hung-kai, PMSM 
 Mr Ho Chi-chiu, PMSM 
 Mr Ng Chee-kin, PMSM 
 Mr Yiu Mook-ting, PMSM 
 Mrs Bonnie Yee-lo Smith, PMSM 
 Mr Ko Chi-ming, PMSM 
 Mr Ma Chik-man PMSM 
 Mr Brian John Heard, PMSM 
 Mr NgaiAI Fung-yee, PMSM 
 Mr Chik Ki-yan, PMSM 
 Mr Chan Chin-cheung, PMSM 
 Mrs Liu Lau Yuk-chun, PMSM 
 Mr Tang Kam-moon, PMSM 
 Mr Tang King-shing, PMSM 
 Mr Au Ka-hing, PMSM 
 Mr Lo Chuen-man, PMSM 
 Mr Au Hok-lam, PMSM 
 Mr Paul Janvrin Deal, PMSM

1999 
 Mr Peter Geoffrey Hunt, PMSM 
 Mr Koo Sii-hong, PMSM 
 Mr Kong Shing-shun, PMSM 
 Mr Peter George Else, PMSM 
 Mr Li Chung-kin, PMSM 
 Mr Li Chi-keung, PMSM 
 Mr Lam Kam-hung, PMSM 
 Mr Yuen Pui-wing, PMSM 
 Mr Geoffrey Leonard Merrick, PMSM 
 Mr Cheung Shui-chun, PMSM 
 Mr Leung Lau-on, PMSM 
 Mr Chan Kwing-chun, PMSM 
 Mr Chan Wai-ki, Thomas, PMSM 
 Mr Chan Lun, PMSM 
 Mr Tsang Wai-hung, PMSM 
 Mr Yip Suen, PMSM 
 Mr Chow Yin-wo, PMSM 
 Ms Barbara Rose Willison, PMSM 
 Mr Lau Kwok-lai, PMSM 
 Mr Choy Wise, PMSM 
 Mr Stuart Edwin Jones, PMSM 
 Mr Denis Claude Cunningham, PMSM 
 Mr Tam Kwok-wing, PMSM

2000 
 Mr John Francis Breen, PMSM 
 Mr Kong Chi-kai, PMSM 
 Mr Lee Ka-chiu, PMSM 
 Mr Li Tat-wah, PMSM 
 Mr To Chun-wai, Clarence, PMSM 
 Mr Chau Siu-man, PMSM 
 Mr Yung Tak-wai, PMSM 
 Mr Cheung Siu-wah, Charlie, PMSM 
 Mr Leung Yan-keung, PMSM 
 Mr Hui Hon-hung, PMSM 
 Mr Chan Kit-chu, Anthony, PMSM 
 Mr Tong Chi-wah, PMSM 
 Mr Wong Pak-nin, PMSM 
 Mr Wand Wel-hung, PMSM 
 Mr YeungG Hong-yuen, PMSM 
 Mr Kevin Michael Woods, PMSM 
 Mr Lau Chi-keung, PMSM 
 Mrs Lau To Yuet-ha, PMSM 
 Mr Lau Kam-wah, PMSM 
 Mrs Lau Tse Kam-har, Angela, PMSM 
 Mr Cheng Kwok-keung, PMSM 
 Mr Tang Hau-sing, Richard, PMSM 
 Mr Fok Man-kwan, Ronald, PMSM 
 Mr Lung Hung-cheuk, PMSM 
 Mr Jawaid Khan, PMSM 
 Mr Ngai Chi-keung, PMSM

2001 
 Miss Shek Kei-ping, PMSM 
 Mr Ho Kwok-cheung, PMSM 
 Mr Lee Woon-luen, David, PMSM 
 Mr Lee Wai-lam, PMSM 
 Mr Chiu Ming-yiu, PMSM 
 Mr Lam Ting-on, PMSM 
 Mr Lam Cho-lam, PMSM 
 Mr Hung Hak-wai, Paul, PMSM 
 Mr Hung Hing-lun, Ricky, PMSM 
 Mr Roderick David George Colson, PMSM 
 Mr Cheung Kwok-wai, PMSM 
 Mr Nicholas Alexandre William McQueen, PMSM 
 Mr Wong Chung-kee, PMSM 
 Mr Wong Sak-pang, PMSM 
 Mr Yeung Kam-ming, PMSM 
 Mr Chiang Kwok-wah, PMSM 
 Mr Tang Chun-kwok, PMSM 
 Mr Sit Ka-shun, PMSM 
 Mr Chung Hok-yee, PMSM

2002 
 Mr Yau Hing-fung, PMSM 
 Mr Chu Kwok-cheung, PMSM 
 Mrs Kong Cheung Chi-lan, PMSM 
 Mr Ho Kwok-hung, PMSM 
 Mr Chow Kwok-kee, PMSM 
 Mr Cheung Kwok-chung, PMSM 
 Mr Leung Hung-yau, PMSM 
 Mr Chan Chun-hing, PMSM 
 Mr Chan Hon-shing, PMSM 
 Mr Mak Hung-fu, PMSM 
 Mr Fung Kwok-on, PMSM 
 Mr Ip Lau-chuen, PMSM 
 Mr Ip Wai-keung, PMSM 
 Mr Ip Po-chuen, PMSM 
 Mr Lau Yung-kan, PMSM 
 Mr Tang Choi, PMSM 
 Mr Lo Tat-fai, PMSM 
 Mr David Hugh Tallon, PMSM 
 Mrs Lo Li Chui-mei, PMSM 
 Mr So Hoi-chuen, PMSM

2003 
 Mr Kong Cheuk-fai, PMSM 
 Mr Ho Ying-hung, PMSM
 Mr Ng Wui-tat, PMSM 
 Mr Sun Yu-wai, PMSM 
 Mr Lam Yin-ming, Lawrence, PMSM 
 Mr Lam Hon-kei, PMSM 
 Mr David John Carver Trotter, PMSM 
 Mr Wu Chung-hon, PMSM 
 Mr Ling Ching-yan, PMSM 
 Mr Tsui Hok-ming, PMSM 
 Miss Ma Po-lin, PMSM 
 Mr Cheung Sau-wah, Joseph, PMSM 
 Mr Cheung Wui, Thomas, PMSM 
 Mr Leung Shiu-yuk, PMSM 
 Mr Alan R. Cox, PMSM 
 Mr Chan Kin-hung, PMSM 
 Mr Fung Kin-man, PMSM 
 Mr Ip Ping, PMSM 
 Mr Lui Ma-sun, Mason, PMSM 
 Mr Tam Kwok-yau, PMSM

2004 
 Mr Wong Lap-ping, PMSM
 Mr Ng Ka-sing, David, PMSM
 Mr Li Chi-shing, PMSM
 Mr Ling Sin-ching, PMSM
 Mr Noel Desmond Howcroft, PMSM
 Mr Yiu Chi-ming, PMSM
 Mr Yiu Kai-bor, PMSM
 Mr Philip James Woolcott-Brown, PMSM
 Mr Cheung Yee-tim, PMSM
 Mr Cheung Pak-man, Danny, PMSM
 Mr Cheung Hung-tai, PMSM
 Ms Leung Ching-kwan, Grace, PMSM
 Mr Jeffrey Owen Herbert, PMSM
 Mr Chan Sing-tak, PMSM
 Mr Chan Yiu-kwok, PMSM
 Mr Pang Moon-kwan, PMSM
 Mr Chiu Ngai-man, PMSM
 Mr Choy Kin-cheung, PMSM
 Mrs Choi Wong Fung-yee, PMSM
 Mr Tang How-kong, PMSM
 Mr Chung Fat-yeung, PMSM
 Mr Kan Chi-kwong, PMSM
 Mr Austin Kerrigan, PMSM

2005 
 Mr Ho Siu-wing, PMSM
 Mr Lui Chi-hoi, PMSM
 Mr Lui Kwai-hoi, PMSM
 Mr Li Chiu-keung, PMSM
 Mr Cheuk Chun-yin, Albert, PMSM
 Ms Tsui Yee-lin, Elaine, PMSM
 Mr Ma Wai-luk, PMSM
 Mr John Alan Cox, PMSM
 Mr Wong Che-kwong, PMSM
 Mr Wong Wai-fung, Anthony, PMSM
 Mr Yeung Yuk-fai, PMSM
 Mr Ip Kwok-fu, PMSM
 Mr Liu Ho-yee, Alan, PMSM
 Mrs Lau Wong Chun-lai, PMSM
 Mr Lau Chi-keung, PMSM
 Mr Cheng Se-lim, Stephen, PMSM
 Mr Cheng Kwok-ping, PMSM
 Mr Tang Yiu-cheung, PMSM
 Mr William Wallace Murison, PMSM
 Mr Lai Kam-wing, PMSM
 Mr Tse Keung, PMSM
 Mr Kevin Hugh Laurie, PMSM
 Mrs Peasley Kwan Mei-sim, PMSM
 Mr Yim Wai-kwok, PMSM

Hong Kong Fire Services Medal for Meritorious Service (FSMSM)
1998 
 Mr Chu Ping-hang, FSMSM 
 Mr Lee Chee-chung, FSMSM 
 Mr Yau Hoi-yeung, FSMSM 
 Mr Cheung Ho-mo, FSMSM 
 Mr Tam Chi-chung, FSMSM

1999 
 Mr Yuen Hon-kwan, FSMSM 
 Mr Butt Wing-keung, Cyril, FSMSM 
 Mr Kwok Yiu-loy, FSMSM 
 Mr Tang Tat-hung, FSMSM

2000 
 Mr Laurence Henry Lee, FSMSM 
 Mr Woo King-huen, FSMSM 
 Mr Tong Koon-ngai, FSMSM 
 Mr Yuen Kam-chuen, FSMSM 
 Mr Kwok Shui-kam, FSMSM 
 Mr Chan Ho-chin, FSMSM 
 Mr Cham Tak-wai, FSMSM 
 Mr Tong Choi-yuk, FSMSM 
 Mr Wan Shiu-wing, FSMSM 
 Mr Lau Yu-ping, Joseph, FSMSM

2001 
 Mr Chan Chi-ming, FSMSM 
 Mr Chn Kwok-wing, FSMSM 
 Mr Wun Hon-bong, Augustine, FSMSM 
 Mr Wong Chi-hung, FSMSM 
 Mr Yeung Yiu-wing, FSMSM 
 Mr Cheng Tak-chuen, Patrick, FSMSM 
 Mr Tang Che-hung, FSMSM 
 Mr Lai Yuet-yau, FSMSM 
 Mr Lai Wai-lau, FSMSM

2002 
 Mr Lee Tin-ping, FSMSM 
 Mr Lee Kai-yuen, FSMSM 
 Mr Chow Wing-tak, FSMSM 
 Mr Wu Kar-wo, FSMSM 
 Mr Cheung Chi-yin, FSMSM 
 Mr Leung Shiu-hong, Matthew, FSMSM 
 Mr Fung Kam-wah, FSMSM 
 Mr Yeung Yau-yuen, FSMSM

2003 
 Mr Lee Mui-lam, FSMSM
 Mr Wong Shun, FSMSM 
 Mr Ng Lap-fun, FSMSM 
 Mr Chow Kin-chung, FSMSM 
 Mr Yuen Hung-chai, FSMSM 
 Mr Chan Chi-kwong, FSMSM 
 Mr Chan Ping-kuen, FSMSM 
 Mr Chan Yun-pui, FSMSM 
 Mr Lau Sik-on, FSMSM

2004 
 Mr Ting Woon-sum, FSMSM
 Mr Ho Wai-kit, FSMSM
 Mr Ng Bong-loy, FSMSM
 Mr Wu Yiu-wah, FSMSM
 Mr Chan Chor-sing, FSMSM
 Mr Mak Tung-ching, FSMSM
 Mr Tung Tung-san, FSMSM
 Mr Lai Man-hin, FSMSM
 Mr Chung Cheong-wai, FSMSM

2005 
 Mr Ho Nai-hoi, FSMSM
 Mr Lui Kin-chung, FSMSM
 Mr Chan Nam-kay, FSMSM
 Mr Wong Sai-chuen, FSMSM
 Mr Wong Hung-cheong, FSMSM
 Mr Choy Chik-wah, FSMSM
 Mr Tse Yui-chiu, FSMSM
 Mr Law Hung, FSMSM

Hong Kong Immigration Service Medal for Meritorious Service (IMSM)
1998 
 Mr Ting Wing-chuen, IMSM 
 Mr Fong Yiu-hing, IMSM 
 Mr Ho Kwok-yan, IMSM 
 Mr Leung Ping Kwan, IMSM 
 Miss Fung Yuen, Yolanda, IMSM 
 Mrs Poon Leung Kit-ching, IMSM 
 Mr Huen Shu-sum, IMSM 
 Mr Law Yiu-tung, IMSM

1999 
 Mr Wong Shiu-wing, John, IMSM 
 Mr Li Yat-ming, IMSM 
 Mr Hui Kung-shun, IMSM 
 Mrs Chan Kwok Yee-wah, Eva, IMSM 
 Mr Chan Kar-chuen, IMSM 
 Mr Ip Hon-tong, IMSM 
 Mr Liu Kwok-keung, IMSM 
 Mrs Cheng Chow Kit-yu, IMSM

2000 
 Mr Man Hon-yin, IMSM 
 Mr Lam Hin-kwan, IMSM 
 Mr Cheung Chow, IMSM 
 Mr Leung Ka-wai, IMSM 
 Mr Yeung Kai-ning, IMSM 
 Mr Chiu See-wai, William, IMSM 
 Miss Lo Hin-cheung, Elaine, IMSM

2001 
 Mr Ho Kam-ping, IMSM 
 Mr Ho Wing-tak, IMSM 
 Mr Lee Kwok-woo, IMSM 
 Mr Wai Fok-cheung, Paul, IMSM 
 Mr Ma Chiu-mo, IMSM 
 Mr Leung Ka-ching, Peter, IMSM 
 Mr Wong Wai-man, Raymond, IMSM 
 Mr Tang Man-kit, IMSM

2002 
 Mr Au Cheuk-luen, IMSM 
 Mr Cheung Lee-kan, IMSM 
 Mr Choi Kwok-fai, IMSM 
 Mr Lo Man-hong, IMSM 
 Mr Yim Kwan-hoi, IMSM

2003 
 Mr Ng Ting-hi, IMSM 
 Mr Wai Chuen, IMSM 
 Mr Chun Yiu, IMSM 
 Mrs Au Fan Mei-lin, IMSM 
 Mr Chan Kwok-lun, Douglas, IMSM 
 Mrs Wong Wong Pak-kei, Peggy, IMSM

2004 
 Mr Bok Kwok-on, IMSM
 Mr Wan Siu-fung, IMSM
 Mrs Chow Tong Kit-ling, Ann, IMSM
 Mr Chan Yuk-chuen, IMSM
 Mr Cheng Ping-yat, Bennet, IMSM
 Mr Tse Yiu-cheuk, IMSM

2005 
 Mr Ng Kwok-wai, IMSM
 Mr Kong Chi-ming, IMSM
 Mr Cheung Chin-hung, IMSM
 Mr Pang Kin-mo, IMSM
 Miss Wan Shiu-mei, IMSM
 Mr Tam Wing-yin, IMSM

2007
 Mr Mak Kin-ming, IMSM
 Mr Chow Kun-wah, IMSM
 Miss Ng Fung-kwan, IMSM
 Mr Tang Yun-hoi, Alan, IMSM
 Mr So Kin-pong, Samson, IMSM

Hong Kong Customs and Excise Medal for Meritorious Service (CMSM)
1998 
 Mr Chow Kwong, CMSM 
 Mr Chow Oi-tung, CMSM 
 Mr Au Yee-leung, CMSM 
 Mrs Kwok Young Mei-ki, CMSM 
 Mr Wong Shiu-ming, CMSM

1999 
 Mr Chu Ching-wan, CMSM 
 Mr Lee Kwok-choy, CMSM 
 Mr Wai Chi-hung, CMSM 
 Mr Wong Sau-pui, CMSM 
 Mr Tse Kwok-yin, CMSM

2000 
 Mr Wong Man-on, CMSM 
 Mrs Szeto Lam Lai-ping, Virginia, CMSM 
 Mr Chow Wing-keung, CMSM 
 Mr Leung Ho, CMSM 
 Mr Tsang Hing-kam, Ronny, CMSM

2001 
 Mr Ho Siu-chung, CMSM 
 Mr Chan Chun-wai, CMSM 
 Mr Chan Hon-kit, CMSM 
 Mr Pang Lock-yuen, CMSM 
 Mr Lo Ying-kuen, CMSM

2002 
 Mr Li Chung-leung, CMSM 
 Mr Lam Ming-mon, CMSM 
 Mr Tong Ching-kit, CMSM 
 Mr Chan Wing-shing, CMSM 
 Mr Tsang Hoi-ping, CMSM 
 Mr Man Wing-yiu, CMSM

2003 
 Mr Ko Chi-lok, CMSM 
 Mr Leung Chi-chiu, William, CMSM 
 Mr Leung Koon-wah, CMSM 
 Mr Wong Pui-fai, CMSM 
 Mr Lai Chun-kong, CMSM 
 Mr Kung Yiu-fai, CMSM

2004 
 Mr Wong Man-ming, CMSM
 Mr Ho Yick-tung, CMSM
 Mr Ng Wai-ming, CMSM
 Mr Li Man-chi, CMSM
 Mr Au Yeung Ho-lok, Luke, CMSM
 Mr Cheng Kam-muk, CMSM
 Mr Tam Yiu-keung, CMSM

2005 
 Mr Wong Ching-lim, CMSM
 Mr Leung Kwong-wing, CMSM
 Mr Tsang Chiu-chun, CMSM
 Mrs Tse Ko Lai-yee, Nora, CMSM
 Mr Tam Wai-lun, CMSM
 Mr So Yuen-sang, CMSM

Hong Kong Correctional Services Medal for Meritorious Service (CSMSM)
1999 
 Mr Lee Siu-on, CSMSM 
 Mr La Siu-keung, CSMSM 
 Mr Cheung Ming, CSMSM 
 Mr Cheng Man-wai, CSMSM

2000 
 Mr Chu Siu-lam, CSMSM 
 Mr Yuen Shu-fan, CSMSM 
 Mr Wong Sing-chi, CSMSM 
 Mr Lau Kam-tong, CSMSM 
 Mr Lau Kam-tong, CSMSM

2001 
 Mr Yue Bun-chiu, CSMSM 
 Mr Lee Gar-san, CSMSM 
 Mr Chan Hon-yiu, CSMSM 
 Mr Samson Chan, CSMSM 
 Mr Tsang Kwok-keung, CSMSM 
 Mr Lau Siu-yin, CSMSM

2002 
 Mr Leung Wai-ping, CSMSM 
 Mr Kwok Kai-sin, CSMSM 
 Mr Mak Wai-kwan, CSMSM 
 Mr Wong Tack-sing, CSMSM 
 Mr Wong Yiu-chung, CSMSM 
 Mr Yeung Kam-sang, CSMSM 
 Mr Lung Kwok-kin, CSMSM

2003 
 Mr Fong Kung-fu, CSMSM
 Mr Cheung Chi-sing, CSMSM
 Mr Leung Wai-man, CSMSM
 Mr Mok Ho-cheung, CSMSM
 Mr Tsang Wing-kan, CSMSM
 Mr Wong Man-chiu, Vanny, CSMSM
 Mr Ip Pak-keung, CSMSM
 Mr Choy Tin-bo, CSMSM
Mr Ying Kwok-ching, CSMSM

2004 
 Mr Ho Pui-lam, CSMSM
 Mr Lee Kwok-biu, CSMSM
 Mr Lam Fat-wing, CSMSM
 Mr Yiu Chiu-kit, CSMSM
 Mr Hung Wai-cheung, CSMSM
 Mr Leung Kam-shing, CSMSM
 Mr Chan Kow-lun, CSMSM
 Mr Mak Yau-tak, CSMSM
 Mr Kiu Cheung-wan, CSMSM

2005 
 Miss Fong Yin, CSMSM
 Mr Lee Wing-hong, CSMSM
 Mr Tsui Siu-kee, CSMSM
 Mr Luk Yiu-man, CSMSM
 Mr Mak Chi-wai, CSMSM
 Mr Fu Shing-chi, CSMSM
 Mr Pang Chi-keung, CSMSM
 Mr Tam Shiu-ming, CSMSM

Government Flying Service Medal for Meritorious Service (GMSM)
2000 
 Mr Leung Wing-kei, GMSM 
 Mr Chan King-ngai, GMSM

2002 
 Mr Choi Chiu-ming, Jimmy, GMSM

2003 
 Mr Lee Wing-chiu, GMSM 
 Mr Chow Hon-yum, Alex, GMSM

2005 
 Captain Chan Chi-pui, Michael, MBB, GMSM

Hong Kong ICAC Medal for Meritorious Service (IMS)
1998 
 Mr Lee Chi-hung, IMS 
 Mr Neil Maloney, IMS 
 Mr Pang Tad-yan, Paul, IMS

1999 
 Mr Tso Wai-yan, Kenny, IMS 
 Mr Chow Jun-lung, Carmel, IMS 
 Mr Brian John Carroll, IMS

2000 
 Mr Hui Kar-man, Ricky, IMS 
 Mr Chan Chor-keung, IMS

2001 
 Mr Yiu Cheuk-wah, George, IMS 
 Mr Cheung Wah-pong, Louis, IMS

2002 
 Mr Ng Ping-kwok, IMS 
 Mr Wong Kwok-leung, IMS

2003 
 Mr James Neil Parkinson, IMS 
 Mr WONG Shiu-cheung, Danny, IMS

2004 
 Mr Peter Gregory, IMS 
 Mr Cheung Chung-tat, Anthony, IMS

2005 
 Mr Fok Chi-cheong, IMS 
 Mr So Ping-hung, IMS

Medal of Honour (MH)

Chief Executive's Commendation for Community Service
1998 
 Mr Man Chen-fai 
 Mr Chu Kwan 
 Mr Tsui Park-chuen 
 Mr Chu Moon-shing 
 Mr Ng Ping-kwan 
 Mr Ng Ki 
 Mr Li King-wah 
 Mr Lee Kit-wah, Keith 
 Mr Lee Kang-ching 
 Ms Lum Bor-mie 
 Mr Lam Yan-fook 
 Mr Lam Luk-wing Chan Po-king, Betty
 Ms Lam Chui-ling 
 Mr Ying Yu-hing 
 Mr Keung Shing-cheung 
 Mr Miu Wah-chang 
 Mr Chan Tai-ki 
 Mr Chan Yee-pon 
 Mr Leung Chi-pui 
 Mr Kwok Chi-hung 
 Mr Cheung Ming-hop 
 Mr Mak Lam-wing 
 Mr Luk Wai-kwok 
 Mr Chan Wai-wing 
 Ms Sum Yung-ho
 Ms Leung Shun-kam 
 Mr Wong Chi-keung 
 Mr Tsik Pak-sun 
 Mr Wong Kwok-keung 
 Mr Wong Kuen-wai, William 
 Ms Yeung Sin-hung 
 Mr Yeung Woon-ki 
 Ms Po Fung-ping 
 Ms Cheng Chee-hing, Jane 
 Mr Lau Yan-tak 
 Mr Tang Ying-kee 
 Mr Siu Shing-choi 
 Mr Lo Yui-chuen 
 Mr Siu Hing-keung 
 Mr Chung Man-chai 
 Mr Kui Kwok-sing, Sunny 
 Mr Lo Keung 
 Mr So Bay-hung

1999 
 Mr Yu Li-guang 
 Mr Wen Choy-bon 
 Mr Dong Ki-Kong 
 Mr Ho Wing-fat 
 Mrs Ho LEE Yok-moy 
 Mr Ho Pui-sai, Tony 
 Ms Ho King-hung 
 Ms Yu Ngar-nei 
 Ms Ng Sai-woon 
 Mr Ng Kwai-hung 
 Ms Lui Lai-bing 
 Mr Lee Sing-hong 
 Mr Lee Lau-shek 
 Miss Lee Cho-ying 
 Mr Lee Ning-choun 
 Mr Li Yui-kin 
 Mr Shen Jin-kang 
 Mr Lam Sing-fan 
 Mr Hiew Moo-siew 
 Ms Yau Mei-ying 
 Mr Hung Tenny 
 Mr Wu Ting-yau 
 Mr Tong Chai-fong 
 Mr Tsui Hin-ching 
 Mr Yuen Wing-wo 
 Mr Cheung Man-ping, Mervyn 
 Ms Cheung Yuk-ying 
 Mr Cheung Kwok-che 
 Mr Cheung Tak-chung, Eric 
 Mr Leung Kam-pui 
 Mr Mok Kam 
 Mr Kwok Yick-hon 
 Mr Chan Fong 
 Mr Chan Kwai-sang 
 Mr Chan Tai-chiu 
 Mr Yau Chun-ying 
 Mr Wong Man-leung 
 Mr Wong Chi-keung 
 Mr Wong Kwok-ting 
 Mr Yip Tak-lam 
 K.Y. Yip 
 Mr Liu Chi-keung 
 Mr Liu Hon-wo 
 Mr Lau Wai-wing 
 Mr Lau Chi-fai 
 Mr Lu Hin-ki 
 Ms Poon Siu-ping, Nancy 
 Ms Choi Heung-lin 
 Mr Lai Tak-chuen 
 Mr Lo Ka-leung 
 Ms Tam Shiu-duen, Teresa 
 Mr Kwan Fern-hay 
 Miss Eeva Liisa Tuulikki Tynkkynen

2000 
 Mr Ting Kam-yuen 
 Mr Chu Chor-sing, David 
 Mr Ho Bat 
 Mr Yu Kwan-hing 
 Mrs Yu Leung Oi-chun 
 Mr Ng Chi-ming 
 Dr Alexander Ng
 Mr Lee Hung-sham, Lothar 
 Mrs Lee LING Wing-chu 
 Mr Li Hon-hung 
 Mr Lee Shu-fan, Frank 
 Mrs Yuen CHAN Po-hing 
 Ms Chau King-ham 
 Mr Chow Ming 
 Mr Chow Kam-cheung 
 Mr Hung Bing 
 Mr Heung Ping-lam 
 Mrs Au Ning, Lucy 
 Mr Cheung Chi-wah 
 Mr Leung Ho-kwan 
 Mr Leung Chiu-shing 
 Mr Malcolm B. Begbie
 Mr Chan Lee-shing 
 Ms Chan Kun-ling 
 Mr Chan Kit-wai 
 Mr Chan Yuen-sum, Sumly 
 Mr Chan Kwong-ho 
 Mr Chan Shu-yung 
 Mr Chan Shu-wah 
 Mr Chan Yiu-wah 
 Mr Mak Kwok-kit 
 Ms Mak Lai-hung, Kitty 
 Mr Tsang Yan-fat 
 Mr Twang Cheung-wing 
 Ms Wong Yuk-shan, San 
 Ms Wong Pik-kiu 
 Mr Wong Chak-piu, Philip 
 Mr Wong Yiu-wah 
 Mr Yeung Chiu-ming 
 Mr Yeung Hok-ming, David 
 Mr Yip Man 
 Mr Yip Yiu-chung 
 Ms Lau Shui-chi 
 Ms Au YEUNG Po-chun 
 Mr Choy Wai-lam 
 Miss Cheng Wai-hing 
 Mr Tang Chee-shing 
 Miss Lo Pui-chun 
 Mr Kwong Yiu-wah 
 Mr So Chung-ping 
 Mr So Wa-wai 
 Dr So Kwan-tong 
 Ms So Oi-kwan

2001 
 Ms Fong Mee-kiu
 Mr Ng Siu-cheung
 Mr Chu Lap-pun
 Miss Yu Lai-fan
 Ms Ng Fung-ching
 Mr Shum Tung
 Mr Lee Chi-kwong
 Mr Lee Wai-wing, Derek
 Ms Li Fai
 Ms Li Lin
 Mr Chow Yiu-wing
 Mr Lam Chong-kee
 Mr LamChiu-kuen
 Mr Hou Chun-kau
 Mr Graham Smith
 Mr Wu Man-ming
 Mr Ling Kin-chun
 Mr Ma Kam-wah, Timothy
 Mrs Leung TAM Wo-ping
 Mr Hui Wing-ho
 Mr Hui Chiu-fai
 Miss Chan Ming-yee, Nancy
 Mr Chan Ming-yiu, Samson
 Mr Chan Chun-kwan
 Ms Chan Lai-sheung
 Mr To Sheck-yuen
 Mrs Pang SO Lai-yung
 Mr Tsang Kui-woon
 Mr Fung Man-kit
 Mr Wong Siu-kwan
 Sister Wong May-may
 Ms Yeung Kin-tong
 Mr Yip Lun-ming
 Mr Liu Keung
 Mr Poon Sai-cheung
 Mr Poon Kin-lui
 Mr Choi Yuk-kwan, Tony
 Mr Choi Chi-man
 Mr Lo Pak-leung
 Mr Siu Sue-kwei
 Mr Lo Sai-kwong
 Ms Tam Wai-chun
 Mr Yim Tin-sang

2002 
 Mr Kwu Hon-keung 
 Mr Chu Chun-yin, Benny 
 Mr Ho Hin-ming 
 Mr Chow Kam-siu, Joseph 
 Ms Lam Yuk-chun 
 Mr Lam Chiu-lun 
 Mr Lam Kit-sing 
 Mr Wong Yiu-chung 
 Mr Wan Yuet-cheung 
 Mr Wai Woon-nam 
 Mr On Hing-ying 
 Mrs Chu Tang Lai-kuen 
 Mr Yiu Wei 
 Mrs Lee Chuck Yuk-ping, Marion 
 Ms Li Oi-kwan 
 Mrs Yuen Lai Lai-bing 
 Mrs Cheuk Chung Kwok-yee, Goretti 
 Mrs Wat Lai Yuet-ngor 
 Mr Chiu Bing-hang 
 Mr Lam Hoi-shing 
 Mr Yau Kam-ping 
 Mr Yuen Ching-bor, Stephen 
 Mr Cheung Shiu-yip 
 Mr Leung Keung 
 Mr Chong Yum-leung 
 Ms Hui Fung-nga 
 Mr Chan Ka-yun 
 Mr Chan Chuen-yik 
 Mrs Chan Cheng Mei-chu, Dorothy 
 Mr Mak Ping-fai 
 Mr Wong Ming-kwong 
 Mr Wong Pak-yuen 
 Mr Yeung Sui-sang 
 Mr Lau Sum-por 
 Mr Lau Tak-hing 
 Mr Tsoi Chiu-hee 
 Ms Cheng Chiu-kuen 
 Mr Cheng For 
 Ms Tang Siu-chee 
 Dr Dai Lok-kwan, David 
 Mr Chung Yam-cheung 
 Ms Nip Fung-yee 
 Mr Kwan Shek-yin 
 Mr Yim Yat-chor 
 Ms So Sui-fong

2003 
 Ms Lee Ying, Robena
 Mr Tsui Fan
 Mr Cheung Yan-hong
 Mr Leung Wai-kuen, Edward 
 Mr Hui Kam-shing 
 Mr Chan Sze-chung 
 Mr Chan King-wong 
 Ms Chan Ka-mun, Carmen 
 Mr Chan Tak-ming 
 Mr Mak Fu-ling 
 Mr Wong Hoi-yue 
 Mr Wong Kai-ming 
 Mr Lo Yuk-fun 
 Mr Wan Hing-sheung 
 Ms Ng Choy-che, Nora 
 Mrs Joanna Chu
 Mr Kong Wai-yeung 
 Mr Ho Ping-chiu 
 Mr Yu Kon-wing 
 Miss Yu Chui-yee 
 Mr David Shum 
 Professor Shum Kar-ping 
 Mr Li Nai-yiu 
 Ms Lee Yee-ling 
 Mr Lee Hung-tzee 
 Mr Chow Chi-cheong 
 Mr Chau Kam-piu 
 Ms Lam Kam-yung 
 Mr Lam Cheung-chi 
 Mr Lam Kin-ko 
 Mr Lam Fook-chuen 
 Mrs Tsui Yu Mui-hing 
 Mr Mah Hoon-leong, Alan 
 Mrs Ma Lo Yok-ming, Ada 
 Mr Leung Kwok-fai 
 Mr Leung Kai-wah 
 Mr Kwok Ming-wa 
 Mr Kwok Kam-moon 
 Mr Chan Wing-on 
 Mr Chan Kwong-ming 
 Mr Chan Che-kwong 
 Mr Chan Yim-pui 
 Mr Chan Cheung-yee 
 Mr Chan Fu-sang 
 Mr Chan Yun-kan 
 Mr Chan Keng-chau 
 Ms Luk Wai-ming, Seraphina 
 Mr Tsang Chuen 
 Mr Fung Chin-choi 
 Mr Wong Chi-fung 
 Mr Wong Pui 
 Mr Wong Tse-yam 
 Ms Wong Yin-lee 
 Mr Yeung Kim-wai, Thomas 
 Mr Yip Ye-shie 
 Mr Ip Seng-chi, Barnabas 
 Mr Lau Wing-chuen 
 Mr Tsoi Man-yuen 
 Mr Lai Wing-hoi, Frederick 
 Mr Lo Wan-sing, Vincent 
 Mr Lo Wun-chong 
 Mr Tam Fook-tin 
 Mr Kwan Bun-fong 
 Mr So Ka-wing

2004 
 Mr Sung Wai-ching
 Ms Lee Wai-king, Starry
 Mr Lam Ka-keung
 Mr Or Chong-shing
 Mr Au Ning-fat, Alfred
 Mr Chan Kok-wah, Ben
 Mr Chan Kwok-kai
 Mr Wong Kin-pan
 Mr Lau Tin-sang
 Mr Lo Sam-shing
 Mr Ting Moon-tin
 Mr Man Yan
 Mr Wong Yam-yin
 Mr Koo Yeung-pong
 Mr Shek Kin-wah
 Mr Ho Hon-man
 Mr Yu Do-sing
 Professor Albert Lee
 Mr Li Pau-tai
 Mr Li Kwok-hung
 Mr Li Kwok-hung
 Mr Lee King-chung
 Mr Chau Sui
 Mr Chu Chiu-san
 Ms Lam Siu-ling
 Mr Lam Wai-biu
 Mr Lam Ming-sum
 Mr Yew Ka-on
 Mr Paul Ashley Keylock
 Ms Au Yim-lung, Lilianna
 Mr Cheung Chi-wing
 Mr Peter Chung
 Mr Cheung Chun-bun
 Mr Cheung Kin-yan
 Mr Leung Kai-ming
 Mr Leung Kam-wa
 Mr Fu Shu-keung
 Ms Kwok Chi-ying
 Ms Chan Siu-chu
 Mr Chan Ping
 Mr Chan Chi-chiu, Henry
 Mr Chan Chee-wing, Steven
 Ms Chan Pui-chun
 Mr Chan Kam-chiu
 Mr Chan Kin
 Mr Luk Keung
 Mr Fu Lark-tong
 Mr Tsang Kin-ping
 Mr Tsang Kwok-keung
 Mr Tsang Kam-ming
 Mr Wong Sui-kwong, Luke
 Ms Wong Loi-tai
 Mr Wong Chit-man
 Mr Wong Wai-chung
 Mr Wong Yiu-wing
 Mr Wan Wah-on
 Mr Lui Tak-hung
 Mr Liu Chi-leung
 Mr Lau Hak-kai
 Mr Lau King-for
 Mr Lau Ming-ki
 Mr Lou Cheuk-wing
 Mr Pun Kwok-wah
 Mr Cheng Ting-foo
 Mr Tang Siu-fai
 Mr Tang Hoi-tung
 Mr Tang Shek-ching
 Mr Lai Tak-shing
 Mr Kwong Kam-wing
 Mrs Lo Ma Lai-wah
 Mr Tam Yat-yuk
 Mr Tam Shiu-wah
 Ms Ta Lai-kuen
 Mr So Chi-ki
 Mrs Pushpa Gurung

2005 
 Mr Chow Yiu-ming, Alan
 Mr Lam Faat-kang
 Ms To Kwai-ying
 Miss Mak Mei-kuen, Alice
 Ms Fung Mei-wan
 Mr Lai Siu-tong, Andy
 Ms Lung Shui-hing
 Reverend Man Chi-on, Steve
 Miss Wong Wai-fun, Fermi
 Mr Ng Kwok-chun
 Ms Lui Fung-ming
 Mr Li Kwok-wah
 Mr Lee Tak-kuen
 Mr Lin Siu-sau
 Mr Lam Kwok-keung
 Mr Yiu Ka-wan
 Mr Yuen Kwai-choi
 Ms Shalini Mahtani
 Mr Cheung Yik-kam
 Dr Cheung Tat-leung
 Mr Leung Yuk-wing
 Mr Leung Kam-ming
 Ms Leung Yim-fan, Cannie
 Ms Hui So-shan
 Mr Kwok Wing-keung
 Dr Richard Tan
 Mr Chan Hak-kan
 Ms Chan Sau-yin
 Mr Chan Mou-keung, Haydn
 Mr Chan Shiu-kuen
 Mr Chan Cheung
 Miss Chan Yui-chong
 Mr Chan Kuen-kwan
 Mr Mak Chi-yan
 Ms Fong Choi-peng
 Mr Wong Yao-wing, Robert
 Mr Wong Wai-suen
 Ms Wong Lam-chun
 Mr Wan Kwok-hung, Joseph
 Mr Yip Chung-ling
 Mr Yip Chun-keung
 Dr iP Wai-cheung
 Ms Poon Wan-tak
 Miss Lai Wai-ling
 Mr Siu Pui-yau
 Dr Chien Ping, Eric
 Ms Kung Wai-hang

Chief Executive's Commendation for Government/Public Service
1998 
 Mr Li Wan-suen, Clement 
 Mr Lee Ming-kwai 
 Ms Lee Mei-mei 
 Mr Ho Ka-ming, Roman 
 Mr Li Kin-cheung, Edward 
 Mr Ng Wai-cheong 
 Mr Lam Sui-lung, Stephen, JP 
 Mr Heung Sai-ho, Simon 
 Mr Yu Chak-ting 
 Miss Tong Yuen-fun 
 Mr Chan Hau-wai, John 
 Mr Chan Yung-suen 
 Mr Cheung Wan-ching, Clement 
 Mr Wong Wing-hang 
 Mr Wong Shut-yung 
 Mr Wong Hung-chiu, Raymond, JP 
 Mr Liu Chun-sang 
 Mr Chak Hoi-leung 
 Mr Tang Man-bun 
 Mrs Lau Lee Lai-kuen, Shelley, JP 
 Mr Tsoi Tak-man 
 Mr Law Siu-hing 
 Captain Andrew Raeside Robertson
 Mrs Tam Lo Nam-wah, Ella

1999 
 Mrs Kiang Wong Kin-fan 
 Mr Yu Chun-cheong, Ricky 
 Miss Ng Man-wah, Pauline 
 Mr Lee Lap-sun, JP 
 Mr Ma Chi-kin 
 Mr Leung Pui-kong, Peter 
 Mr Leung Ka-ming 
 Mr Leung Woon-yin 
 Ms Mary Kwok 
 Mr Shum Hin-man 
 Mr Wan Shun-leung, Henry 
 Mr Anthony Alan Godfrey
 Mr Chiu Hon-bun 
 Mr Poon Chak-fai 
 Mr Cheng Kwok-keung, Vincent 
 Miss Cheng Wai-fung, Winnie 
 Mr Tang Kam-moon

2000 
 Mr Pit Dick-wah 
 Mr Ng Wai-keung 
 Mr Lui Kwok-fai 
 Mr Lee Mui-lam 
 Mr Chau Hung-on 
 Mr Lam Man-wah 
 Mr Michael Leslie Squires
 Captain Trevor Keith Marshall 
 Mr Leung Fee-ling 
 Mr Kwok Chor-ngar 
 Mr Chan Kwok-leung 
 Mr Chan Kwok-keung 
 Mr Chan Kwong-man 
 Mr Luk Ho-sang 
 Mr Tsang Yuk-ming 
 Mr Tsang Wan-hing 
 Mr Ching Yu-tuen 
 Mr Wong Chee-ying 
 Mr Wong Kam-sui 
 Mr Wong Chun-ming 
 Mr Wong Shing-chak 
 Mr Yip Kwai-sun 
 Mr Chim Sin-fai 
 Mr Chow Hon-ching 
 Mrs Lau Chan Yuk-lin, Eliza 
 Mrs Cheng Lee Wai-lin, Victoria 
 Mr Tang Wing-keung 
 Miss Lai Fung-har, Nancy 
 Mr Tam Shiu-hang 
 Mr Chow Chuk-yuk, Justin 
 Mr Chan Chi-san 
 Mr Choi Yue-ning 
 Mr Tam Kwok-ming 
 Mr Kong Yiu-ming

2001 
 Miss Wong Hang-yee
 Mr Ho Kam-ching
 Mr Yu Kwok-ping, Ronny
 Mr Lam Kin-yee
 Mr Cho Wing-kin
 Mr Kwok Shing-pui, Eddy
 Ms Chan Pui-kan, Margaret
 Mr Chan Hok-sheung
 Mr Chan Kam-lun
 Mr Tsang Lin, Reynold
 Mr Wong Chiu-foon
 Mr Liu Chi-keung
 Ms Choi Chow-kwai
 Mr Lai Kwok-ming
 Mr Law Wai-fung
 Mr Tam Ki-chu
 Mrs Kwan Chong Lai-yu, Connie

2002 
 Mr Fong Man-ching 
 Mr Wong Ping-nam, Jimmy 
 Mr Chu Bik-leung, Andrew 
 Mr Ho Yuet-ming 
 Ms Ng Chui-yi 
 Mr Li Siu-hing 
 Mr Chow Hing-chiu 
 Mr Yau Wai-keung 
 Mr Chan Kung-lok 
 Mr Chan Chi-man 
 Mr Chan Wai-man 
 Mr Chan Hon-kin 
 Mrs Lo Kwan So-ha 
 Mr Wong Kit-nang 
 Mr Wong Shu-kun 
 Mr Wong Kam-tong 
 Mr Lau Chun-keung 
 Mr Lau Shiu-hong 
 Mr Tang Ka-kwong 
 Mr Chin Tsang-kung 
 Mr Tai Yu-kwong 
 Mr Tse Kwok-hung 
 Mr Law Kam-wing 
 Mr Kwan Tin-lung 
 Mr Yim Kwok-ching, Timothy

2003 
 Mrs Lo Ku Ka-lee, Clarie, JP
 Mr Cheng Ka-wah, MBB
 Mr Lau Chi-keung, PMSM
 Mr Chan Yung-suen
 Mr Ng Man-kim
 Mr Ng Ka-wing
 Mr Lee Shiu-fat
 Mr Lam Kwok-on
 Mr Lam Wah-yuk
 Mr Kee Kam-por
 Mr Ki Tak-sun
 Mr Yuen Kam-wong
 Ms Cheung Yuk-wah, Emily
 Miss Cheung Woon-yee
 Mr Leung Kam-shing
 Ms Leung Fung-ying, Frances
 Mr Hui So-ho
 Captain Chan Shu-kei, Marcus
 Ms Poh Ying-chu
 Mr Fung Yui-sang
 Mr Yong Sang-chang
 Mr Chak Pui-yan
 Mrs Tse MOK Cho-yin
 Mr Chung Pui-sum
 Mr Tam Po-wah

2004 
 Captain Tang Pui-tung, MBB
 Dr Wong Man-ha, Monica
 Mr Ku Chi-chung, Damien
 Mr Ng Kwok-keung
 Mr Ho Chi-keung, Albert
 Mrs Ho LAM Yin-yee
 Ms Yu Yuk-siu, Loretta
 Mrs Yu KWAN Chui-man, Jenny
 Miss Ng Yau-lan, Ada
 Captain Ng Chi-wah, Michael
 Mr Ng Kam-chiu
 Ms Lee Oi-kin
 Captain Shum Chi-wai, Calvin
 Mr Chow Kwing-yiu
 Mr Lim Leung-ban
 Mr Lam Leung-chau
 Ms Alison Cabrelli
 Ms Sin Lan-kwai, Sophia
 Mrs Yuen Kwong Sau-yee, Cecilia
 Mr Ko Wing-cheung
 Dr Au Tak-kwong
 Mr Cheung Kam-pui
 Mr Leung Koon-hung
 Miss Leung Suk-ping, Christina
 Mr Chan Siu-kei
 Mr Chan Wai-keung
 Mrs Chan Yuen Po-yee, Pauline
 Dr Stephen Gowan Chandler
 Mr Chan Yum-hei, Ernest
 Dr Chan Yiu-wing
 Ms Lo Yuet-yee
 Dr Tsang Chiu-yee, Luke
 Dr Tsang Ho-fai, Thomas
 Mr Wong Doon-yee, Charles
 Mr Wong Tang-kin, Kennedy
 Mr Yeung King-chi, Denny
 Mr Yip Chee-kuen
 Mr Au Yin-shan
 Mr Choi Shu-ki
 Mr Cheng Wing-tat
 Mr Tang Pak-biu
 Mr Tang Lung-wah, Edward
 Mr Lai Chak-lam
 Mrs Lu Chan Ching-chuen
 Mr Sit Siu-fung
 Mr Kan Chi-fai
 Mr Ngai Wang-sang
 Mr Kwong Siu-cheung
 Mr Law Ming-wai

2005 
 Mr Ng Wai-ping
 Mr Lui Kwok-ming
 Ms Li Hoi-yan, Anita
 Mr Lee To-lung, Laurence
 Miss Yiu Yun-siu
 Mr Or Shi-hung
 Miss Tong Po-hoi, Linda
 Mr Yuen Wing-chun
 Mr Cheung Tze-leung
 Mr Leung Chiu-pun
 Mrs Kwok Lam Yee-kwan, Helen
 Ms Lo Pik-wai, Yvonne
 Mr Fung Chow-kwei
 Ms Wong Yuet-ngor, Anne Marie
 Ms Yeung Tsui-har
 Mr Ip Tin-sung
 Mr Yip Ka-fai, Daniel
 Mr Choi Wing-cheong
 Mr Chung Shui-pang
 Mrs Chung Tsui Soo-ying
 Mr Pong Kam-loi
 Mr Law Bing-ching
 Mr Kwan Kam-fai
 Mr So Hok-lai

References

External links
 Recipients of Hong Kong Special Administrative Region Honours and Awards 

Civil awards and decorations of Hong Kong